Budapesti Honvéd SE is a canoeing team based in Budapest, Hungary. Bp. Honvéd's canoeing section is composed of men and women teams.

International success

Olympic medalists
The team's olympic medalists are shown below.

World Championships

European Championships

References

External links
Kayak-Canoe section website 
Official Budapesti Honvéd SE website 

Sport in Budapest
Canoe clubs
Canoeing in Hungary
Sports teams in Hungary